West Bend is an unincorporated community in Polk County, in the U.S. state of Missouri.

History
A post office called West Bend was established in 1853, and remained in operation until 1865. The community was named for a nearby meander on the Little Sac River.

References

Unincorporated communities in Polk County, Missouri
Unincorporated communities in Missouri